Bánh chưng is a traditional Vietnamese food which is made from glutinous rice, mung beans, pork and other ingredients. Its origin is told by the legend of Lang Liêu, a prince of the last king of the Sixth Hùng Dynasty, who became the successor thanks to his creation of bánh chưng and bánh giầy, which symbolized, respectively, the earth and the sky. Considered an essential element of the family altar on the occasion of Tết, the making and eating of bánh chưng during this time is a well-preserved tradition of Vietnamese people. Beside the Tết holiday, bánh chưng is also eaten all year round as Vietnamese cuisine.

Origin and Symbolism

According to the book Lĩnh Nam chích quái (Extraordinary stories of Lĩnh Nam) published in 1695, the creation of bánh chưng was credited to Lang Liêu, a prince of the last Sixth Hùng Dynasty of the Hùng dynasty (c. 1712 - 1632 BC). It was said that in choosing a successor among his sons, the monarch decided to carry out a competition in which each prince brought a delicacy representing the sincerity for the ancestors on the occasion of Tết, whoever could introduce the most delicious dish for the altar would become the next ruler of the country. While other princes tried to find the rare and delicious foods from forest and sea, the eighteenth prince, Lang Liêu, who was the poorest son of the Hùng king, could not afford such luxurious dishes and had to be content with everyday ingredients, such as rice and pork. He created one cake in the square form of earth called bánh chưng and one in the round form of sky called bánh giầy from these simple ingredients. In tasting the dishes offered by his son, the Hùng king found bánh chưng and bánh giầy not only delicious but also a fine representation of the respect for ancestors. Therefore, he decided to cede the throne to Lang Liêu and bánh chưng, bánh giầy became traditional foods during Tết. Lang Liêu founded the Seventh Hùng dynasty (c. 1631 - 1432 BC).

Considered an indispensable dish of Tết, bánh chưng is placed on the family altars to honor the family ancestors and pray to them for support in the new year. Wrapped in a green square package, bánh chưng symbolizes the earth, the various ingredients of bánh chưng, which come from all the products of nature, also emphasize the meaning of bánh chưng with Vietnamese people.

Ingredients and presentation

The required ingredients of bánh chưng are glutinous rice, mung bean, fatty pork and black pepper, salt, sometimes green onion, and nước mắm for salty taste.  In the wrapping stage, one needs lá dong, strings split from giang, one type of bamboo which has long node, and sometimes a square mold in wood so that bánh chưng can be wrapped in a better shape, lá dong, which is popular only in Southern Asia, can be substituted by banana leaves or even lá bàng. Lá dong and giang strings have to be washed carefully in order to preserve the taste of the cake, giang strings may be soaked in water or steamed so that they become flexible enough for wrapping and tying. People often choose high quality rice and beans for making bánh chưng. The mung beans are soaked in water for approx. 2 hours and the glutinous rice for 12 to 14 hours. The mung beans are drained, cooked and mashed into a paste.  The fat in the pork is preferred for bánh chưng because its fatty flavor associates well with the glutinous rice and mung beans. After being sliced in approx. half-inch thick strips, the pork is mixed with pepper, onion, salt and nước mắm. Sugar can also be added to this mixture of spices.

The cake is wrapped in the following order. First, the giang strings and two lá dong leaves are placed as the square base for the bánh chưng. Then glutinous rice is stuffed in lá dong, followed by mung bean, pork, more mung bean and finally another layer of rice so that bean and pork can be respectively in the center of the cake. The ingredients are carefully wrapped in lá dong and bound by giang strings in the square form. In order to get a near perfect square-shaped cake, the maker can use a square mold to help in the wrapping and pressing the ingredients to fill the corners of the square mold. To keep the cake from mold or being spoiled, bánh chưng should be wrapped as tight as possible. 

The prepared cakes are arranged in a large pot (with recommended spacing between cakes, using chopsticks, bamboo or other spacers). The pot is filled with fresh water and boiled for hours until they are cooked thoroughly. As the water evaporates during cooking, more boiled water should be added to keep the cakes submerged at all time. The outer-most layer of rice turns green because the rice absorbed the color of lá dong. One bánh chưng is often divided into 8 (triangular shaped) or 9 (square shaped) pieces, usually by using the very giang string that bounded the cake. As the cake was formed from several ingredients, the taste of bánh chưng varies from part to part with different flavors of glutinous rice, pork, bean and even the wrapping lá dong. Bánh chưng is often served with pickled onions or vegetables, chả lụa and nước mắm. After unwrapping, bánh chưng remains edible for several days when stored in the refrigerator, while an unopened one can be kept for up to two weeks in the refrigerator. Bánh chưng can also be frozen and thawed again for consumption, though the quality is not as good as a fresh cake. Bánh chưng has the water activity value aw of about 0.95 and its pH is approximately 6.4.

History and tradition

Bánh chưng is always considered an essential element of a traditional Tết, which is described by a popular couplet:

Women wear áo dài for their tradition. Traditionally, bánh chưng requires a preparation of many ingredients, each Vietnamese family which can afford such a preparation begins to make the cake from the 27th or 28th day of the December (tháng Chạp) in Lunar calendar. In making bánh chưng, all members of the family gather to perform different tasks, from washing the lá dong, mixing the pork with spices, preparing the mung beans and most important wrapping all ingredients into the square form and boiling the cakes. Bánh chưng needs to be carefully boiled for ten to twelve hours during which the adults and children sit together around the boiling cauldron. In the countryside, to ensure that bánh chưng is available for every family even the poor ones, a fund called họ bánh chưng is jointly set up and about one month before the Tết, the accumulated capital and benefit are divided between members of the fund so that they can have enough money to prepare bánh chưng.

Nowadays, the tradition of self-made bánh chưng gradually declines in Vietnam when the size of a typical family is smaller and people do not have enough time for the preparation and making of bánh chưng. Instead, they go to the bánh chưng shop or order cakes in advance from families that specialize in making them. Therefore, bánh chưng still appears in each family during the Tết but they are not a family product any more. With the shift of bánh chưng making from family to specialized manufacturers, some craft villages became famous for their reputation in making bánh chưng such as Tranh Khúc village or Duyên Hà village both in Thanh Trì, Hanoi.

Each year, on the occasion of the Death anniversary of the Hung Kings, a competition of making bánh chưng and bánh dày is often organized in Hùng Temple, Phú Thọ. Participants from eight different regions including Lào Cai, Hanoi and Cần Thơ are provided with 5 kg of glutinous rice, bean, 1 kg of pork so that they can make 10 bánh chưng in 10 minutes, the product of the winning team will be present in the official altar of the festival. In 2005, bánh chưng makers in Ho Chi Minh City offered Hùng Temple a pair of giant bánh chưng and bánh giầy, the size of the bánh chưng measured 1.8m x 1.8m x 0.7m (71 x 71 x 27.5 inches) and weighed 2 tonnes after cooking, it was made in Ho Chi Minh City and subsequently transferred to Phú Thọ.

Variations

While being normally eaten warm or at room temperature, bánh chưng may be also fried up and served in form of crisp pancake called bánh chưng rán or bánh chưng chiên
(fried bánh chưng). The writer Vũ Bằng in his book Thương nhớ mười hai (Longing of the 12 months) mentioned bánh chưng rán as a delicious dish during the cold February of Hanoi. In some regions, instead of bánh chưng, people make bánh tét which is a cylindrical cake with almost the same ingredients as bánh chưng. A similar cake as bánh tét is made in some regions in the North but with the name bánh tày or bánh chưng dài (long bánh chưng). Bánh tày is often made with small quantity of mung bean and little or no pork so that it can be preserved for a longer period, bánh tày can be cut in slices and fried like bánh chưng rán. San Diu people has another variation of the long bánh chưng with a hump in the middle of the cake, hence it is called bánh chưng "gù" ("humped" bánh chưng), besides lá dong, bánh chưng "gù" is wrapped by an additional type of leaf named lá chít.

There are also variations of bánh chưng for vegetarians and Buddhists which do not contain pork such as bánh chưng chay (vegetarian chưng cake) or bánh chưng ngọt (sweeten chưng cake), instead of pork, these cakes are stuffed with molasses or brown sugar. For these variations, sometimes they mix glutinous rice with gac so that the cake can have a red skin which is more appetizing. In the countryside, bánh chưng chay was once made by the poor families who could not afford the pork for stuffing, they replaced pork by cardamom, black pepper and cooked mung bean, this type of bánh chưng was eaten with molasses.

See also

 Bánh tẻ
 List of rice dishes
 List of steamed foods
 List of stuffed dishes
 Lo mai gai
 Pamonha
 Tamale
 Zongzi

References

New Year foods
Vietnamese words and phrases
Steamed foods
Stuffed dishes
Rice cakes
Vietnamese pork dishes
Bánh
Legume dishes
Vietnamese rice dishes